is a Japanese actress and essayist. She dropped out of Wayo Women's University.

Filmography
 W's Tragedy (1984)

External links

JMDb profile (in Japanese)

References

1962 births
Living people
Japanese essayists
Actresses from Tokyo